The Rómulo Gallegos International Novel Prize was created on 6 August 1964 by a presidential decree enacted by Venezuelan president Raúl Leoni, in honor of the Venezuelan politician and President Rómulo Gallegos, the author of Doña Bárbara.

The declared purpose of the prize is to "perpetuate and honor the work of the eminent novelist and also to stimulate the creative activity of Spanish language writers".

It is awarded by the government of Venezuela, through the offices of the  Rómulo Gallegos Center for Latin American Studies (CELARG). The first prize was given in 1967. It was awarded every five years until 1987, when it became a biannual award.

The award includes a cash prize of  making it among the richest literary prizes in the world.

Award winners

 1967: La casa verde, by Mario Vargas Llosa of Peru (English translation: The Green House)
 1972: Cien años de soledad, by Gabriel García Márquez of Colombia (English translation: One Hundred Years of Solitude) 
 1977: Terra nostra, by Carlos Fuentes of Mexico (translated as Terra Nostra)
 1982: Palinuro de México, by Fernando del Paso of Mexico
 1987: Los perros del paraíso, by Abel Posse of Argentina
 1989: La casa de las dos palmas, by Manuel Mejía Vallejo of Colombia
 1991: La visita en el tiempo, by Arturo Uslar Pietri of Venezuela
 1993: Santo oficio de la memoria, by Mempo Giardinelli of Argentina
 1995: Mañana en la batalla piensa en mí, by Javier Marías of Spain (English translation: Tomorrow in the Battle Think On Me)
 1997: Mal de amores, by Ángeles Mastretta of Mexico (English translation: Lovesick)
 1999: Los detectives salvajes, by Roberto Bolaño of Chile (English translation: The Savage Detectives)
 2001: El viaje vertical, by Enrique Vila-Matas of Spain
 2003: El desbarrancadero, by Fernando Vallejo of Colombia
 2005: El vano ayer, by Isaac Rosa Camacho of Spain
 2007: El tren pasa primero, by Elena Poniatowska of Mexico
 2009: El País de la Canela, by William Ospina of Colombia
 2011: Blanco nocturno, by Ricardo Piglia of Argentina (English translation: Target in the Night)
 2013: Simone, by Eduardo Lalo of Puerto Rico (English translation: Simone: A Novel)
 2015: Tríptico de la Infamia, by Pablo Montoya of Colombia
2020: El país del diablo, by Perla Suez of Argentina

References

External links
 Award page at Rómulo Gallegos Centre for Latin American Studies (CELARG)

Spanish-language literary awards
Venezuelan literary awards
Fiction awards
Awards established in 1964
1964 establishments in Venezuela